Abdus Sattar is a politician in West Bengal, India, belonging to the Indian National Congress. He was a former Communist Party of India (Marxist) Politician. After the 2006 West Bengal state assembly election (in which he was elected MLA from the Amdanga constituency) he became Minister of State for Minorities Development, Welfare and Madrasah Education in the Left Front Ministry. Sattar was the president of the West Bengal Madrasah Board before serving as minister.

Primarily he is a professor of Bengali literature and language and a research scholar of Rabindra literature.

References

Communist Party of India (Marxist) politicians from West Bengal
People from North 24 Parganas district
Year of birth missing (living people)
Living people
State cabinet ministers of West Bengal